Senator Aguon may refer to:

Frank Aguon (born 1966), Senate of Guam
John P. Aguon (fl. 1980s-1990s), Senate of Guam